YBAS (or Ybas) can mean:

Young British Artists, commonly abbreviated as YBAs
Alice Springs Airport, an Australian airport with the ICAO code YBAS